Four vessels of Britain's Royal Navy have borne the name HMS Dominica, named for the island of Dominica.

 was a schooner purchased in 1805, whose crew mutinied in 1806 and turned her over to the French who sent her out as the privateer Napoleon. Within four days of the mutiny  had recaptured her; she was taken back into service under her original name and broken up in 1808.
 was the privateer schooner Tape a L’Oeil, which  captured in 1807. Dominica was lost in a hurricane off Tortola in August 1809.
 was the French privateer schooner Duc de Wagram, which the Royal Navy captured in 1809 and purchased the next year. The American privateer  captured her in 1813, but  recaptured her in 1814. She was recommissioned and was wrecked on the Bermuda Reefs off Bermuda in 1815 while escorting a convoy.

Royal Navy ship names